is a shōnen gag manga by Kazuo Umezu.

Plot
The series follows the odd life of kindergartener Makoto Sawada and his family. Makoto gets into all sorts of toilet and adult humor. He sometimes dresses in his mother's and sister's clothing, and often has a long strand of mucus dangling from his nose.

Film
An animated film adaptation of the manga directed by Tsutomu Shibayama titled Makoto-chan was released in Japan on July 26, 1980, where it was distributed by Toho.

References

Sources

External links
 Kazuo Umezu Official Homepage
 Gwashi at the Kazuo Umezu Official Homepage 
 

1976 manga
1980 anime films
1988 manga
Animated films based on manga
Films directed by Tsutomu Shibayama
1980s Japanese-language films
Kazuo Umezu
Manga adapted into films
Shogakukan franchises
Shogakukan manga
Shōnen manga
TMS Entertainment
Toho animated films